Gary Bettenhausen (November 18, 1941 – March 16, 2014) was an American midget car driver. He was the winner the 1967 and 1970 Turkey Night Grand Prix, the 1972 Astro Grand Prix, and the 1976 Hut Hundred

Personal life
Bettenhausen was born in Blue Island, Illinois, raised in Tinley Park, Illinois, he graduated in 1962 from Bremen High School in Midlothian, Illinois .

Bettenhausen's father was Indianapolis 500 and sprint car legend Tony Bettenhausen. His brother was former CART driver and team owner Tony. Another brother, Merle, lost his arm in a fiery crash.

He married his wife Wavelyn on January 4, 1964, and the family had three children, Gary Jr., and twin sons Cary and Todd.  They had two grandchildren.  Cary and Todd run a medical products company in Indiana and have numerous patents.  In addition, Todd is a well-known eSports gamer involved in motorsport simulation equipment.  According to Indianapolis 500 radio broadcaster Mark Jaynes, the twins attended Monrovia High School with him and current Team Penske crew chief Kyle Moyer. graduating together in 1982.

Bettenhausen died on March 16, 2014, in Monrovia, Indiana.

Racing career

Midgets
Bettenhausen began as a midget car driver. He finished third in the midget car national points in 1967. He won the first leg of the Astro Grand Prix in 1969, which was held in the Astrodome. He won the 1967 and 1970 Turkey Night Grand Prix, the 1972 Astro Grand Prix, and the 1976 Hut Hundred, on his way to a total of 27 career wins in USAC midget car competition.

Sprint cars
Bettenhausen won the 1969 and 1971 sprint car championships.

He won the 1980 and 1983 USAC Dirt Track champions in a Silver Crown car.

A crash at a Championship Dirt Car race (AKA Silver Crown Car) in Syracuse, New York on July 4, 1974, crushed his left arm and left it paralyzed. He regained enough mobility to drive but never fully recovered from the injury.

Indy/Championship Cars & Indianapolis 500
Bettenhausen competed in Champ/Indy style cars from the mid-1960s until 1996. During this time he won six USAC Indy Car races. He made 21 starts in the Indianapolis 500, contesting each event from 1968 until 1982 (with the exception of 1979 when he failed to qualify), and again from 1986 to 1993. His best finish came in 1980 when he finished third after starting 32nd in the 33-car field.

In the 1972 Indianapolis 500, Bettenhausen led 138 laps (of 200), and appeared on his way to victory. But he suffered a blown engine with only 24 laps remaining, and dropped out to finish 14th.

In the 1991 Indianapolis 500, Bettenhausen was the fastest qualifier at 224.468 mph. As his time was recorded on the second day of qualifying, Rick Mears, who had qualified slower (224.113 mph), started on the pole position.

NASCAR
Bettenhausen competed in eight career NASCAR Winston Cup events. He had four Top 10 finishes. His highest career finish was a fourth-place finish at the 1974 Motor State 360 at the Michigan International Speedway.

Awards
He was inducted in the National Sprint Car Hall of Fame in 1993.
He was a 1998 inductee in the National Midget Auto Racing Hall of Fame.

Motorsports career results

American open-wheel racing
(key) (Races in bold indicate pole position)

USAC Championship Car

PPG Indy Car World Series

Indianapolis 500

NASCAR
(key) (Bold – Pole position awarded by qualifying time. Italics – Pole position earned by points standings or practice time. * – Most laps led.)

Grand National Series

Winston Cup Series

Daytona 500

References

External links

1941 births
2014 deaths
People from Tinley Park, Illinois
Racing drivers from Illinois
Indianapolis 500 drivers
Champ Car drivers
NASCAR drivers
National Sprint Car Hall of Fame inductees
People from Monrovia, Indiana
People from Blue Island, Illinois
Bettenhausen family
Team Penske drivers
USAC Silver Crown Series drivers
Bettenhausen Racing drivers